Ferenc Sipos (13 December 1932 – 17 March 1997) was a Hungarian footballer and trainer.

During his club career he played for MTK Hungária FC and Budapest Honvéd FC. He earned 77 caps and scored 1 goal for the Hungary national football team from 1957 to 1966, and participated in the 1958 FIFA World Cup, the 1962 FIFA World Cup, the 1964 European Nations' Cup, and the 1966 FIFA World Cup.

References
Profile (German). Retrieved 19 September 2010 
Hungary - Record International Players. Retrieved 19 September 2010

External links
 

1932 births
Footballers from Budapest
Hungarian footballers
Hungary international footballers
1958 FIFA World Cup players
1962 FIFA World Cup players
1964 European Nations' Cup players
1966 FIFA World Cup players
MTK Budapest FC players
Budapest Honvéd FC players
1997 deaths
Association football midfielders